Joseph Russell (born November 22, 1961) is a former professional tennis player from the United States.

Biography
Russell grew up in California and played in the same junior college team as Brad Gilbert, before transferring to the University of Utah.

A right-handed player, Russell began competing on the international tour in 1988 and based himself in Osaka, Japan. His best ATP Tour performance came at the 1990 Japan Open, where he made the round of 16 as a qualifier, getting past both Tom Nijssen and Dan Goldie, to set up a match against Ivan Lendl. He lost to Lendl in straight sets, but took the world number one to a tiebreak in the first.

Now living in Singapore, he is the co-founder and director of the SITA Tennis Academy.

References

External links
 
 

1961 births
Living people
American male tennis players
American expatriates in Singapore
University of Utah alumni
Tennis people from California
College men's tennis players in the United States